The Malton Range is a mountain range in southeastern British Columbia, Canada, located southwest of the Canoe Reach of Kinbasket Lake and east of the Albreda River, north of Dominion Mountain. It has an area of 451 km2 and is a subrange of the Monashee Mountains which in turn form part of the Columbia Mountains.

See also
Canoe Mountain
Mount Albreda
List of mountain ranges

References

Monashee Mountains
Columbia Country